

Saint Barthélemy

Saint Helena, Ascension and Tristan da Cunha

Saint Kitts and Nevis

Saint Lucia

Saint Martin

Saint Pierre and Miquelon

Saint Vincent and the Grenadines

Samoa

† The code is also assigned to American Samoa

San Marino

São Tomé and Príncipe

Saudi Arabia

Senegal

Serbia

Seychelles

Sierra Leone

Singapore

Sint Maarten

Slovakia

Slovenia

Solomon Islands

Somalia

South Africa

South Georgia and the South Sandwich Islands

South Sudan

Spain

Sri Lanka

Sudan

Suriname

Svalbard and Jan Mayen

Sweden

Switzerland

Syria

Lists of country codes